Unknown Worlds Entertainment is an American video game developer based in San Francisco. The studio is best known for the Natural Selection and Subnautica series. In October 2021, the studio was acquired by South Korean video game developer Krafton.

History
Unknown Worlds was formed in May 2001 by Charlie Cleveland and began life as a group of developers responsible for the development of the high-profile free mod for Half-Life, Natural Selection. The success of Natural Selection convinced Cleveland to start work on a commercial sequel to the game: Natural Selection 2. Soon after, Cleveland founded Unknown Worlds Entertainment as a commercial computer games studio.

Although the casual games market is not the intended direction of Unknown Worlds, Zen of Sudoku, a casual puzzle computer game based on the popular logic puzzle Sudoku, was created in November 2006 in order to generate revenue towards funding the development of Natural Selection 2.  Charlie Cleveland, one of the developers of Unknown Worlds Entertainment, cited casual games development as a "last option" for funding this sequel, having been unwilling to sacrifice control of the company to external investors.

In October 2006, Max McGuire became the studio's co-founder, having previously worked at Iron Lore Entertainment as Lead Engine Programmer. McGuire became the Technical Director of UWE and development of Natural Selection 2 began in earnest. Max and Charlie then attracted a group of angel investors including Richard Kain, Matthew Le Merle, Ira Rothken and Colin Wiel to back the company after a meeting at GDC in San Francisco. A year later, Unknown Worlds released Decoda as a commercial debugger for the Lua programming language. This application was created to aid with development of Natural Selection 2, whose game code was largely being written in Lua.

Later on in development of Natural Selection 2, the studio announced it had changed engine from the Source engine to their own proprietary engine developed in-house. After consulting their fanbase on a possible name for their new engine, it was finally named the Evolution engine. Later, it transpired that the name Evolution was already taken and Spark was chosen as the name for the engine.

In June 2008, Cory Strader was hired as art director. Strader had been a previous key member of the development team for Natural Selection. In May 2009, Unknown Worlds began taking pre-orders for standard and special edition versions of Natural Selection 2. Natural Selection 2 was released on 31 October 2012.

During its 2019 fiscal year, Perfect World sold the majority of its shares in Unknown Worlds to an undisclosed entity. It sold the remainder by August 2021. 
 
In October 2021, South Korean video game developer Krafton, known for having developed PlayerUnknown's Battlegrounds and TERA, announced that it would acquire Unknown Worlds, and that it would continue to operate as an independent game studio.

Games
Half-Life: Natural Selection (2002)
Zen of Sudoku (2006)
Natural Selection 2 (2012)
Subnautica (2018)
Subnautica: Below Zero (2021)
Moonbreaker (2022)

References

External links
 

Video game publishers
Companies based in San Francisco
American companies established in 2001
Video game companies established in 2001
Video game companies of the United States
Video game development companies
2001 establishments in California
2021 mergers and acquisitions
American subsidiaries of foreign companies